Franciszka is a Polish given name, related to English Frances. Notable people with the name include:

Franciszka Arnsztajnowa (1865–1942), Polish poet of Jewish descent
Franciszka Ksawera Brzozowska (1807–1872), Polish noble lady
Franciszka Siedliska (1842–1902), founder of a Roman Catholic religious order of nuns, the Sisters of the Holy Family of Nazareth
Franciszka Themerson (1907–1988), Polish, later British painter, illustrator, filmmaker, and stage designer
Franciszka Urszula Radziwiłłowa (1705–1753), Polish-Lithuanian noble dramatist and writer, first Polish woman playwright

Polish feminine given names